Governor Walker may refer to:

Bill Walker (American politician) (born 1951), 11th Governor of Alaska
Clifford Walker (1877–1954), 64th Governor of Georgia
Dan Walker (politician) (1922–2015), 36th Governor of Illinois
David S. Walker (1815–1891), 8th Governor of Florida
Edward Noël Walker (1842–1908), Acting Governor of British Ceylon from 1895 to 1896
Gilbert Carlton Walker (1833–1885), 36th Governor of Virginia
James Walker (colonial administrator) (1809–1885), Governor of Barbados and the Windward Islands in 1859 and from 1862 to 1869
Joseph Marshall Walker (1784–1856), 13th Governor of Louisiana
Meriwether Lewis Walker (1869–1947), 4th Governor of the Panama Canal Zone
Olene Walker (1930–2015), 15th Governor of Utah
Robert J. Walker (1801–1869), Territorial Governor of Kansas in 1857
Scott Walker (politician) (born 1967), 45th Governor of Wisconsin
Thomas Gordon Walker (1849–1917), Governor of Punjab from 1907 to 1908